Monticello Media is a broadcast corporation that operates six radio stations and two translators in the Charlottesville, Virginia area.  The company was formed in 2007 following the purchase of stations previously owned by Clear Channel Communications. In 2018, the company acquired six stations in the Blacksburg, Virginia area from Cumulus Media.

Stations

Key people
 Owner: George Reed
 General Manager: Mike Chiumento

References

External links
Monticello Media Online

2007 establishments in Virginia
Companies based in Virginia
American companies established in 2007
Radio broadcasting companies of the United States
Mass media in Charlottesville, Virginia
Charlottesville, Virginia